Wilma Pelly (March 5, 1937 – December 28, 2020) was an Aboriginal Canadian film and television actress, best known for her roles as Elsie Tsa'Che in the CBC Television drama North of 60 and as Kookum in Mixed Blessings.

Early life 
Born Wilma Episkenew, she was a member of the Muscowpetung Saulteaux First Nation. She met her husband James Edward Pelly in the 1950s, and moved with him to Calgary, Alberta.

Career 
Pelly worked in factories until launching her acting career. While recovering from a workplace injury in the late 1980s, she answered a casting call for film extras. Her breakthrough role in North of 60, beginning in 1992 and extending throughout the series and into several followup television films, made her an iconic figure in Canadian indigenous communities; her character Elsie, although not always talkative, was wise, dignified and funny, and Pelly was widely recognized as a scene-stealing performer. She was recognized by the Alberta Media Production Industries Association's Rosie Awards as Best Actress in 1998.

Following the conclusion of the regular weekly North of 60 series, Pelly was cast in Giovanni Veronesi's film Gunslinger's Revenge, the production of which marked her first time ever travelling outside of North America. She subsequently appeared in other film and television productions, usually playing an indigenous grandmother or community elder. She also had selected stage roles, most notably appearing in a 2005 production of Uncle Vanya which was staged at the Citadel Theatre in Edmonton before travelling to Ottawa for a production at the National Arts Centre.

Death 
She died on December 28, 2020, in Calgary. Her final film performance, in Rueben Martell's film Don't Say Its Name, was in post-production and had not yet been released at the time of her death.

Filmography

Television
 North of 60 (1992-1997) - Elsie Tsa Che
 Children of the Dust (1995) - Nita
 In the Blue Ground (1999) - Elsie Tsa Che
 Dream Storm (2001) - Elsie Tsa Che
 Another Country (2003) - Elsie Tsa Che
 Dreamkeeper (2003) - Old Woman
 Into the West (2005) - Burnt by the Sun
 Distant Drumming (2005) - Elsie Tsa Che
 Elijah (2007) - Old Woman
 Mixed Blessings (2007-08) - Kookum
 Arctic Air (2014) - Auntie Belle
 Documentary Now! (2015) - Aglatki Qamaniq 
 Fargo (2015) - Native American housekeeper

Film
 Gunslinger's Revenge (1998) - Native Grandmother
 The Last Rites of Ransom Pride (2010) - Old Woman
 Land (2018) - Mary Yellow Eagle
 Parallel Minds (2020) - Kookum
 Don't Say Its Name (2021) - Aggie

References

External links

1937 births
2020 deaths
Actresses from Saskatchewan
Canadian television actresses
Canadian film actresses
Canadian stage actresses
First Nations actresses
People from Fort Qu'Appelle
Saulteaux people
20th-century Canadian actresses
21st-century Canadian actresses
20th-century First Nations people
21st-century First Nations people